Lois Dorothea Low, née Pilkington (born 15 July 1916 in Edinburgh, Scotland, UK - d. 8 November 2002 in Hampshire, England, UK) was a British writer of romance novels  from 1962 to 1983 under different pseudonyms Dorothy Mackie Low, Lois Paxton, and Zoë Cass.

She was elected the fifth  Chairman (1969–1971) of the Romantic Novelists' Association and also was a former Vice-President.

Biography
Born Lois Dorothea Pilkington on 15 July 1916 in Edinburgh, Scotland, UK, she studied in the Edinburgh Ladies' College (now Mary Erskine School). In 1938, she married William Mackie Low, who died in 1981. They had two sons: Roderick Craig Low (b. 1945) and Murray Alexander Robert Low (b. 1949). She worked in insurance and as literary agent.

Low published romance novels from 1962 to 1983, under the pseudonyms of Dorothy Mackie Low, Lois Paxton, and Zoë Cass. She was elected the fifth  Chairman (1969–1971) of the Romantic Novelists' Association and also was a former Vice-President. She died at 86, on 8 November 2002.

Bibliography

As Dorothy Mackie Low

Novels
Isle for a Stranger (1962)
Dear Liar (1963)
A Ripple on the Water (1964)
The Intruder (1965)
A House in the Country (1968)
To Burgundy and Back (1970)
The Glen is Ours

As Lois Paxton

Novels
Man Who Died Twice (1968)
Quiet Sound of Fear (1971)
Who Goes There? (1972)
Man in the Shadows (1983)

Anthologies in collaboration
Woman's Weekly Fiction Series Omnibus Vol. 6 No 3 (The Icon Affair / Smiling Goddess / An Orange Branch / Sophia Verity) (1983) (with Juliet Armstrong, Margaret Redfern, and Briony Tedgle)

As Zoë Cass

Novels
Island Of The Seven Hills (1974)
The Silver Leopard (1976)
Twist in the Silk (1980)

References and sources

                   

Scottish romantic fiction writers
1916 births
2002 deaths
People educated at the Mary Erskine School
20th-century Scottish novelists